College of Aviation & Technology (CATECH) is an engineering institute in Bangladesh to provide internationally recognized Higher Academic Qualification in Aeronautical Engineering as well as pilot training. The college is an approved learning center of Edexcel, BTEB and National University of Bangladesh.

Academic programs
CATECH offers 4 years Hons BBA in Aviation Management & BSc in Aeronautical and Aviation Science courses Under the National University Bangladesh.

Undergraduate level
At undergraduate level CATECH offers:
1. BSc (Hons) in Aeronautical and Aviation Science
2. BBA (Hons) in Aviation Management
3. B.Eng. Aeronautical Engineering.
 B.Eng. Aeronautical Engineering (length of 48 months)
 BBA Major in Aviation Management (length of 48 months)

Graduate level
At graduate level CATECH offers:
Post Graduate Diploma in Strategic Management and Leadership,
Diploma in Aviation Operation
 MBA Major in Aviation Management (length of 24 months)
 Executive MBA in Major in Aviation Management (length of 18 months)

Diploma 
(length of 3 months)
CFD & Applied Aerodynamics
Aerospace Engineering Design
Aeromechanics
Aviation Hospitality
Air Hostess and Cabin Crew
Aviation Management
Travel, Tourism & Ticketing
Aeromodelling
Airlines Cost Management
Air Travel Management
Aircraft Leasing

Pilot training
Pilot training courses prepare students for the Private Pilot and Commercial Pilot Licences.

References

Private colleges in Bangladesh
Colleges in Dhaka District